Argyresthia conjugella, the apple fruit moth, is a moth of the family Yponomeutidae. It is found in North America, Europe, Siberia, Central Asia and Japan.

The wingspan is 10–14 mm. The head is yellowish-white. Forewings are rather dark purplish-fuscous; costa strigulated with whitish; a thick white dorsal streak to tornus; an interrupted dark fuscous median fascia; one or two white costal spots before apex. Hindwings are grey. The larva is dull whitish yellow; head and plate of 2 pale brown.

Adults are on wing from May to July depending on the location.

The larvae feed on Sorbus aucuparia and Malus species.

The Argyresyhia conjugella, or the apple fruit moth, is seen to be a parasite for the apple growing communities in Finland, Norway, and Sweden. These moths are seed predators for the mountain-ash trees rowan (Elameen et al.). However, when there is a dip in the fruit produced by rowan every couple years in this region, the apple fruit moth finds a new host in the form of apples. Apples are not their desired host however and they communicate with the rowan seeds they prefer through odors (Knudsen et al.).

References

Elameen, A; Eiken, HG; Floystad, I; Knudsen, G; Hagen, SB. 2018. Monitoring of the Apple Fruit Moth: Detection of Genetic Variation and Structure Applying a Novel Multiplex Set of 19 STR Markers 22

Knudsen, GK; Bengtsson, M; Kobro, S; Jaastad, G; Hofsvang, T; Witzgall, P. 2008. Discrepancy in laboratory and field attraction of apple fruit moth Argyresthia conjugella to host plant volatiles. 33:1-6.

External links
UKmoths

Moths described in 1839
Argyresthia
Moths of Asia
Moths of Europe
Moths of North America